Hurricane Jova was a strong Pacific hurricane that made landfall in Jalisco, Mexico in October 2011. The cyclone was the tenth named storm, ninth hurricane, and fifth major hurricane of the 2011 Pacific hurricane season. Jova developed from a tropical disturbance that formed on October 5. The disturbance steadily organized and acquired more thunderstorm activity over the following hours, and it became a tropical depression early on October 6. It strengthened into Tropical Storm Jova later that day. Moving generally northward, wind shear initially inhibited the system until the establishment of more favorable conditions on October 8 allowed Jova to begin to intensify. It reached hurricane strength that day as it drifted eastwards, and reached major hurricane status on October 10 after a period of steady intensification. Jova weakened somewhat as it approached the coastline of Mexico, and made landfall near Barra de Navidad, Jalisco on October 12 as a Category 2 hurricane. The storm rapidly weakened as it moved inland and dissipated the next morning.

Tropical cyclone watches and warnings were issued for the coast of Mexico ahead of the storm, extending from Nayarit to Michoacán. The ports of Puerto Vallarta and Manzanillo were closed, stranding some cargo ships. Evacuation shelters were opened across Jalisco. Jova brought destructive winds, flooding rain, and mudslides mainly to Jalisco and Colima, killing nine and leaving six injured. Roads and infrastructure were damaged, and 107,000 electricity customers lost power. Losses caused by Jova amounted to about MX$2.75 billion (US$204 million).

Meteorological history

A well-defined area of low pressure developed within the disturbance later that day as it traveled westwards. Thunderstorm activity associated with the disturbance became more organized over the rest of the day, and it further developed into a tropical depression at 00:00 UTC on October 6. In spite of moderate northeasterly wind shear displacing thunderstorm activity away from the low-level circulation center, Jova intensified slowly through October 7, with rainbands forming northwest of the center. At the same time, the ridge steering Jova began to weaken, causing Jova to decelerate and turn further north.

On October 8, the inhibitive wind shear affecting Jova began to subside. Microwave satellite imagery revealed a nascent eye and eyewall late on October 8, marking Jova's intensification into a hurricane. A reconnaissance aircraft investigating the storm also estimated that the central pressure fell  in an hour, indicative of a quickly strengthening system. Jova became a major hurricane by 06:00 UTC on October 10 and reached its peak intensity twelve hours later with maximum sustained winds of —at the upper end of Category 3 on the Saffir–Simpson scale.

Jova began to weaken gradually on October 11 as an upper-atmospheric trough over the Baja California Peninsula generated southwesterly wind shear over the hurricane while pulling it north-northeastwards. The eye became cloud-filled and the eyewall began to fragment as the wind shear disrupted the storm's organization, causing Jova to weaken below major hurricane status at 12:00 UTC on October 11. The hurricane briefly arrested its weakening trend right before landfall, with the eye becoming visible on satellite imagery once again. The mountains of western Mexico greatly disrupted Jova's circulation as it moved inland, causing Jova to rapidly degrade to a tropical storm within six hours of landfall. The system's surface circulation dissipated entirely by 00:00 UTC on October 13, marking the end of Jova's existence as a tropical cyclone.

Preparations

Early in Jova's duration, the National Hurricane Center predicted that it would strike southwestern Mexico as a hurricane in its five-day forecast. Beginning on October 8, the NHC advised residents in Mexico to monitor Jova's path. The next day, the Mexican government issued a hurricane watch from Punta San Telmo in southwestern Michoacán to Cabo Corrientes, Jalisco, with a tropical storm watch extending further south to Lázaro Cárdenas, Michoacán. Six hours later, watches were upgraded to their respective intensity warnings. A day later, a tropical storm watch was issued north of the hurricane warning area to San Blas, Nayarit.

In Puerto Vallarta, the port was closed. Residents boarded up shops and stayed at home and fishermen stocked up on food and water, though some people failed to prepare like they did in Hurricane Kenna, the last major hurricane to have severe effects on the region. Hotels were deserted and shops were closed. Even though no mandatory evacuations were ordered for the city, businesses were closed and boarded up in nearby towns. Officials in Jalisco opened up 70 shelters in 11 municipalities. The Manzanillo port was closed; 13 cargo ships were stuck after the port closed. The Mexican Navy evacuated a total of 2,600 people.

Impact
Nine people were killed by the storm, and six people were injured. A 71-year-old woman drowned in Colima after a strong current swept away the car in which she and her son were riding. Flooding washed out a bridge and destroyed stretches of highways leading out of Manzanillo, while strong winds damaged transmission cables and billboards in the city. In the neighboring state of Jalisco, a mudslide in the town of Cihuatlan killing a 21-year-old woman and her daughter and destroyed their home. A body of a man swept away by floodwaters was also found in a river. In the town of Tomatlán, a man and a teenage boy died after heavy rain caused their house to collapse in on them. Several roads were damaged by the storm and landslides and flooding blocked three main highways connecting cities in Jalisco and Colima states. Power outages that resulted due to Jova affected 107,000 electricity customers.

Throughout Jalisco, losses from Jova reached MX$1.3 billion (US$96 million) and roughly 46,280 people were affected. In Colima, preliminary losses to the tourism industry were estimated at 170 million pesos (US$13 million). Infrastructural damage from the storm in Colima reached 1.283 billion pesos (US$94.87 million).

See also

 Storms with the same name
 Hurricane Paul (2012)
 Hurricane Winifred (1992)
 Hurricane Willa (2018)

References

External links

 The NHC's advisory archive on Hurricane Jova
 The NHC's graphics archive on Hurricane Jova

Hurricane Jova
Jova
Jova
Jova
Jova